The Chappaqua Central School District is a K-12 public school district serving students in Chappaqua, New York, Millwood, as well as parts of Pleasantville, and Mount Kisco. The current superintendent of schools is Dr.  Christine Ackerman. Chappaqua Central School District is ranked 40th Best School District in the United States by Niche.

Schools and Administrators

Superintendent and Cabinet Positions

Board of Education
July 1, 2022 to June 30, 2023 
Jane Kimmel Shepardson, President
Warren Messner, Vice President
Hilary Grasso
Cailee Hwang
Ryan Kelsey

Schools

Elementary
Douglas G. Grafflin Elementary School
Ms. Debbie Alspach, Principal
Mr. Ryan Spillane, Assistant Principal

Roaring Brook Elementary School
Ms. Tonya Wilson, Principal
Mr. Ross Cooper, Assistant Principal

Westorchard Elementary School
Mr. James Skoog, Principal
Ms. Alissa Stoever, Assistant Principal

Middle schools
Robert E. Bell Middle School
Mr. Geoff Curtis, Principal
Mrs. Jennifer Kean-Thompson, Assistant Principal

Seven Bridges Middle School
Dr. Joe Mazza, Principal
Mrs. Jessica Rappaport, Assistant Principal

High school
Horace Greeley High School
Dr. Sandra Sepe, Principal
Dr. Siska Brutsaert, Assistant Principal
Dr. Ron Gamma, Assistant Principal
Ms. Lauralyn Stewart, Assistant Principal
Dr. Joseph Sullivan, Assistant Principal

Former Schools
King Street School (1800s-1930, 1931-1951)
Rural District Schools, Numbers 1-12 (closed 1928)

All of these schools with the exception of the King Street School operated from 1931-1951 were one-room schoolhouses that were merged into Rural School District Number 4, which became known as Chappaqua Central School District Number 4, and then the Chappaqua Central School District.

Real Estate
According to the New York Times, homes in the district had a mean sale price of $966,000 in 2014; which was a significant increase from $892,000 in 2013 and $844,000 in 2010. Homes mostly vary from $525,000-$25,000,000 and the district's mean sale price was at its highest in 2007 at $1,278,000 - just before the housing market crashed. The lowest recorded mean sale price was in 2008 at $822,000.

History
Before the school district was officially chartered, one-room schoolhouses devoid of windows were prevalent. The school districts began merging into what was then known as Rural School District No. 4 of the Towns of New Castle & Mount Pleasant which became the Chappaqua Central School District. The Chappaqua Central School District, pursuant to Education Law, merged to what was then known as Chappaqua School District No. 4 completely by 1927. In need of larger facilities, construction on Horace Greeley School, named for Horace Greeley, a prominent statesman and news publisher that lived in town, began that same year. The building was designed and built by John Borup, as indicated on a plaque outside the entrance by the Auditorium. Construction finished in 1928, and the school opened that September as a grade 1-12 school. In 1937, the Public Works Administration completed an addition including a new gymnasium, and designed by the firm of Tooker & Marsh and built by Wintour J. Hackett & Co. The district principal at the time was Dr.  Robert E. Bell, for whom Bell Middle School is now named. Douglas G. Grafflin, for whom the Grafflin School was named, was Bell's successor as district principal.

In 1951, Roaring Brook Elementary School, which at the time was a one-room schoolhouse, was enlarged into its current building in 1951 and became part of the school district. In 1957, Horace Greeley School moved to its current location at 70 Roaring Brook Road, now as Horace Greeley High School, with the district headquarters moved next door to 66 Roaring Brook Road. The former Horace Greeley School was enlarged and turned into Robert E. Bell Middle School. In 1962, Douglas G. Grafflin Elementary School was finished, and opened its doors that September. In 1971, Westorchard Elementary School was built and opened on a parcel near West Orchard Road. This ended the Chappaqua Central School District's expansion for 32 years.

For a period in the late 1950s, kindergarten and fifth grade classes for the district were housed in J Building at Horace Greeley High School due to overcrowding, which prompted an addition at Roaring Brook and the construction of Douglas Grafflin Elementary School in 1962. For a brief period in the 1970s, there was no room at Roaring Brook Elementary School for kindergarten or fifth grade classes. This was partially alleviated with the construction of Westorchard Elementary School in 1971. In 1974, an addition was hastily erected at Westorchard. In 1973, the district rented the St. John & St. Mary Parish School, which had closed a year earlier, and the building housed fifth grade classes. J Building at Greeley also housed classes. In 1975, "temporary" portable trailers were erected at Roaring Brook Elementary School which housed Roaring Brook's kindergarten classes until 2002.

In 2001, ground was broken on Seven Bridges Middle School, which was built in order to alleviate overcrowding at the town's only middle school, Robert E. Bell Middle School.

In 2002, to address overcrowding, an addition of a new wing for the kindergarten classes was added to Roaring Brook, and the rapidly decaying portables were demolished. In June 2003, Seven Bridges was finished, dedicated in August, and opened its doors to its first students that September. Fifth grade students were then moved to the middle school to help overcrowding at the district's three elementary schools.

Controversy
In 2015, Horace Greeley High School drama teacher Christopher Schraufnagel resigned and was charged with the sexual abuse and child endangerment of three 15-year-old students. All crimes were alleged to have occurred between 2011 and 2015 on campus. The parents of several students (some not involved in the criminal case) subsequently filed a lawsuit against the school district. In 2016, Superintendent Lyn Mckay resigned amid growing public pressure due to the handling of this event.

References

External links
 

Education in Westchester County, New York
School districts in New York (state)
School districts established in 1928